Ashot III (Asotios; Arabic: Ashūṭ ibn Ghirghūr and Ibn Ṭurnīq) was the last independent ruler of the southern Armenian region of Taron from  until his death in 967.

Ashot was a natural son of Grigor I of Taron and half-brother of Bagrat II of Taron. The family were a branch of the Bagratid dynasty. Little is known about his early life. After Grigor I's death (sometime between 923 and 936), Ashot and his half-brother Bagrat assumed the rulership, but their power was limited to only part of Taron: about a half was controlled by their cousin Tornikes, the son of their uncle Abu Ghanim, who also held the title of patrikios. A struggle erupted between the cousins, forcing Tornikes to will his lands over to the Byzantine emperor, Romanos I Lekapenos. When Tornikes died, Romanos sent envoys to take over the territories promised, but Ashot and Bagrat managed to persuade the emperor to leave Tornikes'  lands to them in exchange for the fortress of Olnutin.

By 940, Bagrat II had died and Ashot reigned as sole prince of Taron. In that year, the Hamdanid prince Sayf al-Dawla invaded Armenia. The Arab historian Ibn Zafir records that Sayf al-Dawla devastated Taron and besieged its capital, Mush. Eventually Ashot—whom Ibn Zafir calls the "King of Armenia and Georgia"—was compelled to do him homage, surrender the towns of Sasun and Qulb, and acknowledge his suzerainty at Tadvan near Lake Van. Ashot continued to rule over Taron until his death in late summer or early fall of 967 (dated by some earlier historians to 966). After his death, his sons Grigor and Bagrat surrendered the principality to the Byzantines and entered Byzantine service themselves, founding the noble family of the Taronitai.

References

Sources
 
 

967 deaths
10th-century Armenian people
Princes of Taron
Bagratuni dynasty
Patricii
10th-century rulers in Asia
Year of birth uncertain
Protospatharioi